Antenna Products Corporation is an international communication equipment manufacturer and distributor worldwide. Its products include antennas, tower, masts and relevant communication equipment. Its subsidiary, Antenna Products Corp, is a global manufacture with ISO 9001:2008 certification.

Background
The company is a holding company with subsidiaries including Antenna Products Corp.(APC), Phazar Antenna Corp (PAC) and Thirco, Inc.. APC is also a communication equipment supplier offering antenna, towers and masts worldwide. PAC operates as a division of APC and Thirco is an equipment leasing company. In 2013, the company merged with QAR Industries, Inc. and Antenna Products Acquisition Corp.

See also
Panorama Antennas

References

External links

Companies listed on the Nasdaq
Manufacturing companies based in Texas
Companies with year of establishment missing